Madhav Gothoskar (born 30 October 1929) is a former Indian cricket umpire. He stood in 14 Test matches between 1973 and 1983 and one ODI game in 1981.

See also
 List of Test cricket umpires
 List of One Day International cricket umpires

References

1929 births
Living people
Place of birth missing (living people)
Indian Test cricket umpires
Indian One Day International cricket umpires